Bantoanon or Asi is a regional Bisayan language spoken, along with Romblomanon and Onhan, in the province of Romblon, Philippines. Asi originated in the island of Banton, Romblon and spread to the neighboring islands of Sibale, Simara, and the towns of Odiongan and Calatrava on Tablas Island. The Asi spoken in Odiongan is called Odionganon, Calatravanhon in Calatrava, Sibalenhon in Concepcion, Simaranhon in Corcuera, and Bantoanon in Banton.

Specifically, it is spoken on the following islands within Romblon:

Tablas: the municipalities of Odiongan and Calatrava, situated respectively on the western and northern parts of the island. The Odiongan dialect has more outside influences and is more widely used in literature.
Banton: the island's sole municipality of Banton. 
Simara: the island's sole municipality of Corcuera.
Maestre de Campo (also known as Sibale):  the island's sole municipality of Concepcion.

Linguist David Zorc notes that Bantoanon speakers may have been the first Bisayan speakers in the Romblon region. He also suggests that Asi may have a Cebuan substratum and that many of its words may have been influenced by the later influx of other languages such as Romblomanon.

Nomenclature 
While Bantoanon is the original and most common name of the language, the name , meaning 'why', is also commonly used especially in formal and academic papers. Considering that the language has four other dialects other than Bantoanon: Odionganon, Calatravanhon, Sibalenhon, and Simaranhon, Asi is occasionally used instead of Bantoanon to distinguish between the language and the dialect of it spoken in Banton. The term Asi has uncertain origins, and may have been coined around the 1980s–1990s. Several native Bantoanons have expressed dislike of the new name, saying that it does not represent themselves, but rather promotes something foreign. Speakers of dialects that have evolved through the Bantoanon diaspora prefer Asi, or just their dialect's name. In casual speech, however, native speakers often refer to the language as Bisaya, not to be confused with other Bisayan languages.

Sounds
Bantoanon has fifteen consonant phonemes: p, t, k, b, d, g, m, n, ng, s, h, w, l, r and y. There are three vowel phonemes: a, i/e, and u/o. The vowels i and e are allophones, with i always being used when it is the beginning and middle and sometimes in final syllables, and e always used when it is in final syllables. The vowels u and o are allophones, with u always being used when it is the beginning and middle and sometimes in final syllables, and o always used when it is in final syllables. This is one of the Philippine languages that do not exhibit - allophony.

Grammar

Pronouns

References

External links
 Bantoanon language information
 Webonary.org, Asi (Bantoanon) Dictionary
 SIL Philippines, Archived Resources

Languages of Romblon
Visayan languages